Camille Côté (January 12, 1905 – December 8, 1967) was a Canadian politician.

Born in Montreal, Quebec, Côté was a member of the Montreal City Council from 1940 to 1947. Côté was elected as the Union Nationale candidate to the Legislative Assembly of Quebec for Montréal–Sainte-Marie in 1944. He did not run in 1948.

He died in Montreal in 1967.

References

1905 births
1967 deaths
Montreal city councillors
Union Nationale (Quebec) MNAs